The name Leslie has been used for three tropical cyclones in the Atlantic Ocean.
Tropical Storm Leslie (2000), weak tropical storm that impacted Bermuda, Florida, Cuba, and Newfoundland.
Hurricane Leslie (2012), long-lived Category 1 hurricane that caused minor damage in Bermuda and Newfoundland.
Hurricane Leslie (2018), a long-lived tropical cyclone that constantly fluctuated between tropical storm and Category 1 hurricane intensity, made landfall in the Iberian Peninsula as an extratropical cyclone. 

The name Leslie has also been used in the Southwest Pacific Ocean: 
Cyclone Leslie (1979)

Leslie
South Pacific cyclone set index articles